Astley is a settlement in the Metropolitan Borough of Wigan in Greater Manchester, England. Originally a village, it now forms a continuous urban area with Tyldesley to the north. It lies on flat land north of Chat Moss and is crossed by the Bridgewater Canal and the A580 "East Lancashire Road". Astley contains several listed buildings designated by English Heritage and included in the National Heritage List for England.  Most are listed at Grade II, the lowest of the three gradings given to listed buildings and is applied to "buildings of national importance and special interest".

Astley's listed buildings reflect its history and include farmhouses and ancient halls, two with moated sites. Damhouse or Astley Hall, which for centuries was the manor house for the township, is included in this list although it is just across the boundary in Tyldesley. Astley's second chapel was destroyed in an arson attack in 1961 but the vicarage stands and is listed. Industry in the 20th century is represented by the former engine house and headgear at Astley Green Colliery Museum.

In the United Kingdom "listed building" refers to a building or structure designated as being of special architectural, historical, or cultural significance. They are categorised in three grades: Grade I consists of buildings of outstanding architectural or historical interest, Grade II* includes significant buildings of more than local interest and Grade II consists of buildings of special architectural or historical interest. Buildings in England are listed by the Secretary of State for Culture, Media and Sport on recommendations provided by English Heritage, which also determines the grading.

Key

Buildings and structures

References
Notes

Bibliography
 

Listed buildings in Greater Manchester
Buildings and structures in the Metropolitan Borough of Wigan
Lists of listed buildings in Greater Manchester